This list of past Minicons is in chronological order (which is not the same as numerical order).  Location,  dates, and guests of honor are noted when known.

Minicon 1 
 Year:  1968
 Location:  Coffman Union at the University of Minnesota
 Guests of Honor:  Gordon R. Dickson, Charles De Vet, Clifford Simak

Minicon 2 
 Year:  1969
 Location:  Andrews Hotel; Minneapolis, MN
 Guests of Honor:  Gordon R. Dickson, Charles De Vet, Clifford Simak

Minicon 3 
 Year:  1970
 Location:  Dyckman Hotel; Minneapolis, MN
 Guests of Honor:  Poul Anderson, Gordon R. Dickson,  Clifford Simak

Minicon 4 
 Year: 1971
 Location:  Curtis Hotel; Minneapolis, MN
 Guest of Honor:  Lin Carter

Minicon 5 
 Year:  1971
 Location:  Andrews Hotel; Minneapolis, MN
 Guest of Honor:  Volsted Gridban was listed, but it did not refer to one of the authors who had used that pseudonym being the guest; there was no guest of honor at this Minicon.

Minicon 6 
 Year:  1972
 Location:   Hyatt Lodge; Minneapolis, MN
 Theme:  The Stereo-opticon
 Guest of Honor:  Ruth Berman

Minicon 7 
 Year: 1973
 Location:  Hyatt Lodge; Minneapolis, MN
 Guests of Honor:  Larry Niven (pro), Rusty Hevelin (fan)

Minicon 8 
 Year:  1974
 Location:  Dyckman Hotel; Minneapolis, MN
 Guests of Honor:  Kelly Freas (pro), Bob Tucker (fan)

Minicon 9 
 Year:  1974
 Location:  Dyckman Hotel; Minneapolis, MN
 Guests of Honor:  Judy-Lynn del Rey and Lester del Rey

Minicon 10 
 Year: 1975
 Location:  Holiday Inn
 Guests of Honor:  Poul Anderson (pro), Gordon Dickson (fan), Lester del Rey (toastmaster)

Minicon 11 
 Year:  1976
 Location:  Leamington Hotel
 Guests of Honor:  Edmond Hamilton (pro), Leigh Brackett (pro), Leigh and Norb Couch (fans), Jackie Franke and Rusty Hevelin (toastmasters)

Minicon 12 
 Year:  1977
 Location:  Leamington Hotel
 Guests of Honor:  Ben Bova (pro), Buck Coulson and Juanita Coulson (fans), Joe Haldeman (toastmaster)

Minicon 13 
 Year:  1978
 Location:  Leamington Hotel
 Theme:  Nothing is as it seems.
 Guests of Honor:  Samuel R. Delany (pro), Spider Robinson (fan), Bob Tucker (artist), Krissy (toastmaster)

Minicon 15 
 Year:  1979
 Location:  Minneapolis Radisson
 Guests of Honor:  Theodore Sturgeon (pro), Tom Digby (fan), Rick Sternbach (artist), Robert E. Vardeman (toastmaster)

Minicon 16 
 Year:  1980
 Location:  Minneapolis Radisson
 Guests of Honor:  C. J. Cherryh (pro), Jon Singer (fan), Ken Fletcher (artist), Nate Bucklin (musician), Bob Tucker (toastmaster)

Minicon 17 
 Year:  1981
 Location:  Minneapolis Radisson
 Guests of Honor:  Jack Vance (pro), Jerry Boyajian (fan), Reed Waller (musician), Kathy Marschall (artist)

Minicon 14 
 Year:  1982
 Location:  Saint Paul Radisson
 Theme:  Forward, Into the Past
 Guests of Honor:  John Varley (pro), Clifford D. Simak (fan), Spider Robinson (musician)

Minicon 19 
 Year:  1983
 Location:  Saint Paul Radisson
 Theme:  Backward, Into the Future
 Guests of Honor:  Larry Niven (pro), Pamela Dean and David Dyer-Bennet (fans), Dave Sim (artist), Spider John Koerner (music), Steven Brust (toastmaster), Nostradamus (proxy)

Minicon 18 
 Year:  1984
 Location:  Leamington Hotel
 Theme:  We know what we're doing and you don't.  Trust us.
 Guests of Honor:  Chelsea Quinn Yarbro (pro), Dave Wixon (fan), Stephen Hickman (artist), S.P. Somtow (musician), Rusty Hevelin (toastmaster), Bob Tucker ("smooth")

Minicon 20 
 Year:  1985
 Location:  Radisson South Hotel in Bloomington, Minnesota
 Guests of Honor:  James P. Hogan (pro), The Permanent Floating Riot Club (fan group, the name is a tribute to Larry Niven), The White Women (musicians), Stu Shiffman (artist), Jerry Stearns and Kara Dalkey (toastmasters)

Minicon 21 
 Year: 1986
 Location:  Radisson South Hotel in Bloomington, Minnesota
 Theme:  Now we're just immoral and fattening
 Guests of Honor:  Damon Knight and Kate Wilhelm (pro), Denny Lien (fan), Ken Fletcher (artist), Anne Passovoy (musician), Diane Duane (toastmaster)
 Honored guests: Phyllis Eisenstein, Terri Windling, John M. Ford, P. C. Hodgell

Minicon 22 
 Year:  1987
 Location:  Radisson South Hotel in Bloomington, Minnesota
 Theme:  Still Crazy After All These Years
 Guests of Honor:  David Brin (pro), Fred Haskell (fan), Erin McKee (artist), Jerry Stearns (music), Robert Bloch (toastmaster)
 Honored guests: Diane Duane, Jane Yolen, Ellen Kushner

Minicon 23 
 Year:  1988
 Location:  Radisson South Hotel in Bloomington, Minnesota
 Theme:  Spring Forward, Fall Over
 Guests of Honor:  Eleanor Arnason (author), Eric Heideman (fan), Frederik Pohl (editor), Crystal Marvig (artist), Richard Feynman (science, posthumous)
 Honored guests: Jane Yolen, David Hartwell, Algis Budrys

Minicon 24 
 Year: 1989
 Location:  Radisson South Hotel in Bloomington, Minnesota
 Theme:  Zen and the Art of Fan Maintenance
 Guests of Honor:  Harry Harrison, George "Lan" Laskowski, Fritz Leiber, Barry B. Longyear
 Honored guests:  Patrick Nielsen Hayden, Teresa Nielsen Hayden, P. C. Hodgell, Larry Niven, John Sladek

Minicon 25 
 Year: 1990
 Location:  Radisson South Hotel in Bloomington, Minnesota
 Theme: The Silver Edition
 Guests of Honor:  Jane Yolen, Kim Stanley Robinson (author), Patrick Price ("arthur"), David Thayer a.k.a. Teddy Harvia (artist), DavE Romm (fan), Earl Joseph (science)
 Honored guests:   Dave Clement, P. C. Hodgell, Dr. Joseph Romm, Art Widner

Minicon 26 
 Year: 1991
 Location:  Radisson South Hotel in Bloomington, Minnesota
 Theme:  Think of it as Evolution in Action
 Guests of Honor: George Alec Effinger (author), David Cherry (artist), Al Kuhfeld, Ph.D. (science), Suzanne V. Tompkins and Jerry Kaufman (fans), Jon Singer (lunch)

Minicon 27 
 Year:  1992
 Location:  Radisson South Hotel in Bloomington, Minnesota
 Theme:  Don't Ever Be A Dodo
 Guests of Honor:  Lois McMaster Bujold (author), Ctein (artist), Dave Van Ronk (music)

Minicon 28 
 Year: 1993
 Location:  Radisson South Hotel in Bloomington, Minnesota
 Theme:  Suite, Savage Minicon
 Guests of Honor:  Susan Allison (editor), Diane Duane (author), Peter Morwood (author), Kathy Mar (music), Don Fitch (bless his sweet heart), John M. Ford (interesting person)

Minicon 29 
 Year: 1994
 Location:  Radisson South Hotel in Bloomington, Minnesota
 Theme:  It seemed like a good idea at the time
 Guests of Honor:  Tom Doherty (publisher), Jack Williamson (author), Rusty Hevelin (fan), Phil Foglio (artist)

Minicon 30 
 Year:  1995
 Location:  Radisson South Hotel in Bloomington, Minnesota
 Theme:  Would you like fries with that?
 Guests of Honor:  Vernor Vinge (author), Robert L. Forward (science), Jody Lee (artist), The Bhigg House (fan group)
 Honored guest: Glen Cook

Minicon 31 
 Date:  April 5–7, 1996
 Location:  Radisson South Hotel in Bloomington, Minnesota
 Theme:  Coming Soon to a Galaxy Near You!
 Guests of Honor:  Suzette Haden Elgin (author), Ed Emshwiller (artist, posthumous), Joe Siclari & Edie Stern (fans), David Ossman (audio)

Minicon 32 
 Date:  March 28–30, 1997 
 Location:  Radisson South Hotel in Bloomington, Minnesota
 Guests of Honor:  Algis Budrys (author), C. J. Cherryh (author), Tom Doherty (publisher), Tom Lopez (audio), Patrick Nielsen Hayden (fan), Teresa Nielsen Hayden (fan), Michael Swanwick

Minicon 33 
 Date: April 10–12, 1998
 Location:  Radisson South Hotel in Bloomington, Minnesota
 Theme:  Heisenberg Probably Slept Here
 Guests of Honor:  Gardner Dozois (publishing),  David Langford (fan), John M. Ford (toastmaster)

Minicon 34 
 Date:  April 2–4, 1999
 Location:  Minneapolis Hilton & Towers Hotel
 Guests of Honor:  Octavia E. Butler (author), Mark & Priscilla Olson (fans), David Nee (bookseller)

Minicon 35 
 Date: April 21–23, 2000
 Location:  Hilton Minneapolis & Towers
 Guests of Honor:  Maureen F. McHugh (author), John Berkey (artist), Lenny Bailes (fan)

Minicon 36 
 Date: April 13–15, 2001
 Location:  Hilton Minneapolis & Towers
 Guests of Honor:  Ken MacLeod (author), Jo Walton (fan), Leslie Fish (musician)

Minicon 37 
 Date:  March 29–31, 2002
 Location:   Hilton Minneapolis
 Guests of Honor:  Emma Bull (author),  Will Shetterly (author), Arthur Hlavaty (fan), Rick Berry (artist)

Minicon 38 
 Date: April 18–20, 2003
 Location:   Millennium Hotel in Minneapolis, Minnesota.
 Guests of Honor:  Robert J. Sawyer (author), Carolyn Clink (poet), Sue Mason (fan), Steve Macdonald (musician)

Minicon 39 
 Date:  April 9–11, 2004
 Location:  Millennium Hotel in Minneapolis, Minnesota.
 Guests of Honor:  Walter Jon Williams (author), Sharyn November (editor), Deb Geisler (fan)

Minicon 40 
 Date:  March 25–27, 2005
 Location:  Sheraton Bloomington Hotel in Bloomington, Minnesota
 Theme: Minicon Fortean
 Guests of Honor: Terry Pratchett (author), Fastner & Larson (artists),  James Young (fan)

Minicon 41 
 Date: April 14–16, 2006 
 Location:  Sheraton Bloomington Hotel in Bloomington, Minnesota. 
 Theme: XLi, Robot
 Guests of Honor:  Harlan Ellison (author),  John Picacio (artist),  Doug Friauf (fan)

Minicon 42 
 Date: April 6–8, 2007
 Location:  Sheraton Bloomington Hotel in Bloomington, Minnesota.
 Theme: "And the question was..." (in reference to the number 42)
 Guests of Honor:  Charles de Lint (author),  Charles Vess (artist)

Minicon 43 
 Date: March 21–23, 2008
 Location:  Sheraton Bloomington Hotel in Bloomington, Minnesota.
 Theme: "Digging up the Future"
 Guests of Honor: Alastair Reynolds (author), Wayne Barlowe (artist, in absentia), Shawna McCarthy (editor), Nate Bucklin (fan)

Minicon 44 
 Date: April 10–12, 2009
 Location:  Sheraton Bloomington Hotel in Bloomington, Minnesota.
 Guests of Honor: Karl Schroeder (author), Stephan Martinere (artist, in absentia), Seth Shostak (scientist)

Minicon 45 
 Date: April 2–4, 2010
 Location:  Sheraton Bloomington Hotel in Bloomington, Minnesota.
 Guests of Honor: Brandon Sanderson (author), Daniel Dos Santos (artist)
 Special Guests: Moshe Feder (editor)

Minicon 46 
 Date: April 22–24, 2011
 Location:  Sheraton Bloomington Hotel in Bloomington, Minnesota.
 Theme: "Not yet dead from the neck up"
 Guests of Honor: Charles Stross, (author in absentia), John Scalzi, (author), Chas Somdahl, (musician)

Minicon 47 
 Date: April 6–8, 2012
 Location:  DoubleTree Bloomington Hotel in Bloomington, Minnesota. (Hotel rebranded)
 Theme: "The minions are coming..."
 Guests of Honor: Ted Chiang (author), Christopher J Garcia (fanzine), Frank Wu (artist),
 Special Guest: Brianna "Spacekat" Wu (game developer)

Minicon 48 
 Date: March 29–31, 2013
 Location:  DoubleTree Bloomington Hotel in Bloomington, Minnesota.
 Theme: "The Game of Life"
 Guests of Honor: Julie Czerneda (author), Richard Tatge (fan)

Minicon 49 
 Date: April 17–20, 2014
 Location:  DoubleTree Bloomington Hotel in Bloomington, Minnesota.
 Theme: "Pirates and Airships"
 Guests of Honor: Catherynne Valente (author), Janny Wurts (author), Don Maitz (artist)

Minicon 50 
 Date: April 2–5, 2015
 Location:  DoubleTree Bloomington Hotel in Bloomington, Minnesota.
 Theme: "The Gold Edition"
 Guests of Honor: Jane Yolen (author), Larry Niven author, Brandon Sanderson (author), Tom Doherty (publisher), Adam Stemple (musician), Michael Whelan (artist)

Minicon 51 
 Date: March 25–27, 2016
 Location:  DoubleTree Bloomington Hotel in Bloomington, Minnesota.
 Guests of Honor: Seanan McGuire (author), Sara Butcher Burrier (artist)

Minicon 52 
 Date: April 14–16, 2017
 Location:  DoubleTree Bloomington Hotel in Bloomington, Minnesota.
 Guests of Honor: Brother Guy Consolmagno (scientist)
 Special Guests: Moshe Feder (editor)

References

Science fiction conventions in the United States
Lists of events
Conventions in Minnesota